The rivière du Portage (in English: Portage Rivere) is a tributary of the Bécancour River which flows on the south shore of the St. Lawrence River. The "rivière du Portage" flows in the municipalities of Saint-Valère and Daveluyville, in the Arthabaska Regional County Municipality (MRC), in the administrative region from Centre-du-Québec, to Quebec, to Canada.

Geography 

The main hydrographic slopes of the "Portage river" are:
 north side: Bécancour River;
 east side: Pimbina river, Blanche River;
 south side: Bulstrode River
 west side: Blanche River.

The "Portage River" has its source in an agricultural area of the municipality of Saint-Valère, south of the Defoy hamlet (of Daveluyville), on the east side of route 261 and north of the Bulstrode River.

  north into Saint-Valère;
  north through Daveluyville, passing west of the Defoy hamlet, to highway 20;
  north to its mouth.

The Portage River flows onto the south shore of the Bécancour River, just downstream from Portage Island and downstream from the village of Daveluyville.

Toponymy 

The toponym "rivière du Portage" was made official on December 5, 1968, at Commission de toponymie du Québec.

See also 

 List of rivers of Quebec

Further reading

References 

Rivers of Centre-du-Québec
Arthabaska Regional County Municipality